Joseph Klein (1886–?), Wisconsin machinist and Socialist legislator

Joseph Klein may also refer to:
 Joseph Klein (composer) (born 1962), American composer, conductor, and educator

See also 
 Joe Klein (born 1946) American journalist and columnist
 Joe Klein (baseball executive) (1942–2017), American executive in professional baseball
 Joe Kleine (born 1962), American basketball player